Shaheen Khan, also credited as Sandhya, is an Indian actress who has appeared in Telugu, Tamil, and Kannada films. She played the role of Sandhya in three films in 3 languages. Those films all have the same storyline.

She has also appeared in music videos for Shankar Mahadevan, and has worked as a model with Fair & Lovely.

Shaheen later quit the film industry after her marriage with Sidhant Mohapatra .

Filmography

References

Actresses from Mumbai
Actresses in Kannada cinema
Actresses in Tamil cinema
Indian film actresses
Living people
Year of birth missing (living people)